First-seeded Marcelo Ríos defeated Richard Fromberg 4–6, 6–4, 7–6(7–3) to win the 1998 Heineken Open singles competition. Jonas Björkman was the champion but did not defend his title.

Seeds
A champion seed is indicated in bold text while text in italics indicates the round in which that seed was eliminated.

  Marcelo Ríos (champion)
  Félix Mantilla (semifinals)
  Dominik Hrbatý (quarterfinals)
  Marcelo Filippini (first round)
  Jeff Tarango (second round)
  Brett Steven (second round)
  Daniel Vacek (first round)
  Javier Sánchez (second round)

Draw

External links
 ATP Singles draw

Singles
ATP Auckland Open